was a Japanese football player.

Playing career
Kudaka was born in Osaka Prefecture on March 14, 1963. After graduating from high school, he joined his local club Matsushita Electric (later Gamba Osaka) in 1981. He played as regular player for a long time. Although the club played in Prefectural Leagues in 1981, was promoted to Regional Leagues in 1983 and Japan Soccer League in 1984. In 1990, the club won the Emperor's Cup first major title in his club history. In 1992, Japan Soccer League was folded and founded new league J1 League. In 1994, he moved to rival club in Osaka, Cerezo Osaka in Japan Football League. He played as regular player and the club won the champions in 1994 and was promoted to J1 League. He retired end of 1995 season.

Coaching career
After retirement, Kudaka became a coach at Cerezo Osaka. He mainly coached for youth team. However in summer 1999, he was diagnosed with stomach cancer. He died on September 22, 1999 at the age of 36.

Club statistics

References

External links

1963 births
1999 deaths
Association football people from Osaka Prefecture
Japanese footballers
Japan Soccer League players
J1 League players
Japan Football League (1992–1998) players
Gamba Osaka players
Cerezo Osaka players
Association football midfielders